Entertainer Michael Jackson is regarded as a prolific philanthropist and humanitarian. Jackson's early charitable work has been described by The Chronicle of Philanthropy as having "paved the way for the current surge in celebrity philanthropy", and by the Los Angeles Times as having "set the standard for generosity for other entertainers". By some estimates, he donated over $500 million to charity over the course of his life, at one time being recognized in Guinness World Records for the breadth of his philanthropic work. The actual amount of donations made by Michael may be even higher, but the exact amount is not known since Jackson often gave anonymously and without fanfare. In addition to supporting a substantial number of charities established by others, in 1992 Jackson established the Heal the World Foundation, to which he donated several million dollars in revenue from his Dangerous World Tour.

Aside from monetary donations, Jackson's philanthropic activities also included performing in benefit concerts and giving away tickets for regular concert performances to groups aiding underprivileged children, making hospital visits to sick children and opening his home for visits, with attention to providing special facilities and nurses if the children needed that level of care.  He also donated valuable  personal and professional paraphernalia for numerous charity auctions. Jackson received various awards and accolades for his philanthropic work, including two bestowed by Presidents of the United States.

History

1970s and 1980s

Early activities
Born in 1958, Jackson began engaging in philanthropic and humanitarian efforts while still a member of the Jackson Five and received early recognition by the time he was thirteen. His philanthropic efforts expanded and grew substantially as he stepped out as a solo artist. In December 1978, Jackson "spread Christmas joy among 200 youngsters at the Hollywood Children's Hospital", throwing them a party and giving away autographed posters. The Telegraph noted of Jackson that "[o]ne of his earliest charitable ventures was in 1979, when he donated books, including Peter Pan, to the Chicago Public Library and promoted reading through a programme he called Boogie to the Book Beat". In July 1981, Jackson led a benefit concert at the Omni Auditorium in Atlanta, Georgia, raised $100,000 for the Atlanta Children's Foundation, to aid the poor children of the city in the wake of a string of child kidnappings and murders there. The Jacksons had originally been scheduled to perform a tour date in Atlanta on that day, but reworked the date into a benefit concert in light of the ongoing crisis.<ref name="Post-Atlanta">"Jackson Show To Benefit Kids", The Palm Beach Post (May 7, 1981), p. B-17.</ref>

Later on in the 1980s, Jackson was noted for his support for alcohol and drug abuse charities, and the Ad Council's and the National Highway Traffic Safety Administration's Drunk Driving Prevention campaign. Jackson allowed the campaign to use "Beat It" for its public service announcements. For his efforts in this area, he garnered praise from President Ronald Reagan, and was welcomed at the White House for a ceremony on May 14, 1984 at which Michael was presented with the Presidential Humanitarian Award.

Mid-1980s
The Victory Tour of 1984 headlined the Jacksons as a group, and showcased Michael's new solo material to more than two million Americans. It was the last tour he did with his brothers. Following controversy over the concert's ticket sales, Jackson donated his entire share of the proceeds, an estimated , to charity. Following an incident in 1984 in which Jackson received second and third degree burns to his scalp while filming a commercial for the tour's sponsor, Pepsi, he donated his $1.5 million settlement from Pepsi to the hospital where he had been treated, Brotman Medical Center in Culver City, California; its Michael Jackson Burn Center was named in his honor. Notably, even before this incident, Jackson had made multiple visits to patients in the burn unit and elsewhere in the hospital, stating  that "it makes me feel good to cheer up sick and injured patients in the hospital". Jackson also donated funds from the Victory Tour to several charities, equipping a 19 bed unit at the Mount Sinai New York Medical Center, which is part of the T.J. Martell Foundation for Leukemia and Cancer Research, and enabling Camp Ronald McDonald for Good Times to build a year-round camp facility for children living with cancer.

His charitable work reached new heights with the release of "We Are the World" (1985), co-written with Lionel Richie, which raised money for the poor in the US and Africa. It earned $63 million, and became one of the best-selling singles of all time, with 20 million copies sold. The project's creators received two special American Music Awards honors: one for the creation of the song and another for the USA for Africa idea. Jackson, producer Quincy Jones, and promoter Ken Kragen received special awards for their roles in the song's creation. In 1988, it was described as "the humanitarian effort Michael considers his greatest personal triumph". Humanitarian themes later became a recurring theme in his lyrics and public persona.

From 1985 to 1990, Jackson made substantial donations to the United Negro College Fund (UNCF), endowing $1.5 million to that organization in 1986 to set up the "Michael Jackson UNCF Endowed Scholarship Fund", aimed toward assisting students majoring in performance arts and communications, with money given each year to students attending a UNCF member college or university. Another benefit concert held by Jackson later in the decade brought an estimated $500,000 more for UNCF scholarships.

Bad tour
Yoshiaki Ogiwara, a five-year-old boy from Takasaki, Gunma, Japan, was kidnapped and murdered in September 1987; Jackson was undertaking his "Bad" tour in Japan at the time, and dedicated concerts in Osaka and Yokohama to Yoshiaki's memory, and the single sleeve for "Man in the Mirror", released in February 1988, contains a dedication to Yoshaiki. All profits from that single, the fourth consecutive number one single from Jackson's album, Bad, also went to the charity Camp Ronald McDonald for Good Times, of which Jackson had previously been one of the "Founding Fathers".
 
While on tour in November 1987, Jackson made a surprise visit to the Royal Children's Hospital in Melbourne, Australia, "armed with handfuls of autographed programs and T-shirts", a visit described by hospital staff as "an incredible tonic" for the many terminally ill young patients. Jackson's vocal coach Seth Riggs noted that Jackson would arrange to have sick children brought to his concerts, stating: "Every night the kids would come in on stretchers, so sick they could hardly hold their heads up. Michael would kneel down at the stretchers and put his face right down beside theirs so that he could have his picture taken with them, and then give them a copy to remember the moment". At a number of tour stops, Jackson would also visit with patients at a local children's hospital, and make a substantial donation to the facility. In May 1988, while touring in Rome, Jackson visited children suffering from cancer in the Bambino Gesù Hospital, also donating 100,000 pounds sterling to the hospital. Later that year, following another tour appearance at Wembley Stadium in England, Jackson presented Prince Charles and Princess Diana with a donation of $450,000 for The Prince's Trust, designated for the Great Ormond Street Children's Hospital, described as "a favorite charity of Jackson's". He also visited two wards of that hospital while on that trip.

In February 1989, a few weeks after a mass shooting at the Cleveland Elementary School in Stockton, California resulting in the deaths of five children and the wounding of dozens more, Jackson visited the school and met with some of the children affected by the event.

1990s and the Heal the World Foundation
In 1992, Jackson established the Heal the World Foundation as a charitable organization, inspired by his single of the same name. Jackson also continued to make charitable donations and participate in causes outside of the foundation. Following the 1992 Los Angeles riots, "Jackson donated $1.25 million to start a health counseling service for inner-city kids".

Following the death of HIV/AIDS spokesperson and friend Ryan White in 1993, Jackson used his celebrity to bring global attention to the AIDS epidemic, notably through his friendship with Ryan and his charitable efforts with Elizabeth Taylor. Michael also pleaded with the Clinton administration at Bill Clinton's inaugural gala to give more money to HIV/AIDS charities and research, and performed "Gone Too Soon", a song dedicated to White, and "Heal the World" at the gala. In January 1994, Jackson "opened his Neverland Ranch in a Martin Luther King's Birthday celebration for 100 inner-city children who excelled in school". In 1995, after reading newspaper accounts of the death of a 22-month-old boy, Jackson was moved to donate an undisclosed amount to a fund for the family set up under the auspices of the St. Mary Medical Center in Long Beach, California. In February 1997, Jackson donated a HIStory Tour jacket and an autographed souvenir book "to raise funds for Hawaii's first Gay and Lesbian Cultural Festival".

In the 1990s, Jackson continued to visit children's hospitals and similar institutions, and sometimes individual sick or injured children. For example, in May 1992, Jackson visited a 7-year-old girl who had been mauled by Rottweilers two months before, having telephoned to promise this visit while she was still in the hospital. While touring in 1996, Jackson visited orphanages in Tokyo and Prague, the latter during his HIStory World Tour."Michael Jackson statue is erected where Stalin's was", The Baltimore Sun (September 7, 1996), p. 2D.

In 1995, Jackson composed a charity song, "Children's Holiday", recorded by the Japanese group J-Friends. Proceeds went to a charity to help victims of the Great Hanshin earthquake in Japan. The single was released in 1998. In 1999, J-Friends released another single for charity, "People Of The World", which Jackson executive-produced.

In June 1999, Jackson put together two charity concerts dubbed MJ & Friends. The first was held in Seoul, South Korea and the second in Munich, Germany.  Several other performers took the stage in addition to Jackson and the concerts raised monies to benefit Nelson Mandela's Children Fund, and children's charities in Kosovo and elsewhere. Originally, two additional concerts were planned, but they had to be cancelled due to an injury Jackson sustained during the concert in Munich when, during his performance of "Earth Song", a section of the bridge he was standing on collapsed. He climbed out of the pit that the mechanism landed in and continued the performance, but had to be taken to the hospital when his performance ended and he left the stage.

Heal the World Foundation

The purpose of the Heal the World Foundation (HTWF) was to provide medicine to children and fight world hunger, homelessness, child exploitation and abuse. Jackson stated that he wanted "to improve the conditions for children throughout the world". The foundation also brought underprivileged children to Jackson's Neverland Ranch, located outside Santa Ynez, California, to go on theme park rides that Jackson had built on the property after he purchased it in 1988. It also sent millions of dollars around the globe to help children threatened by war, poverty, and disease. Through his foundation, Jackson airlifted 46 tons of supplies to Sarajevo, instituted drug and alcohol abuse education and donated millions of dollars to disadvantaged children, including the full payment of a Hungarian child's liver transplant.

Part of the proceeds of the Dangerous World Tour, which ran between June 1992 and November 1993 and grossed , went to Heal the World Foundation. 
The Dangerous World Tour began on June 27, 1992, and finished on November 11, 1993. Jackson performed to 3.5 million people in 69 concerts. All profits from the concerts went to the "Heal the World Foundation", raising millions of dollars in relief. 

At the National Football League's Super Bowl XXVII, Jackson performed several songs, including his anthem "Heal the World", to help promote the organization with the assistance of a choir of 750 people and a flash card display involving 98,000 volunteers. Jackson donated his entire fees for the performance to the foundation, with the NFL also donating $100,000 and a 30-second TV spot to push for contributions. Following the Super Bowl, Jackson ran a full-page advertisement in the newspaper USA Today, providing a toll-free number. A coupon was provided that could be clipped and mailed in along with a contribution. Those donating $35 or more were given a "Heal the World" T-shirt. The environmental themed music video for the 1995 single "Earth Song" closed with a request for donations to Jackson's foundation.

 Heal the Kids 
In February 2001, Jackson launched Heal the Kids, an initiative of HTWF and part of the foundation's attempt to boost children's welfare. Jackson launched the charity initiative, stating, "Heal the Kids will help adults and parents realize it's in our power to change the world our children live in".

Jackson gave a speech at Oxford University about raising children, as part of the launch of his "Heal the Kids" initiative.  In the speech, Jackson spoke rhetorically of his children, "What if they grow older and resent me, and how my choices impacted their youth?...Why weren't we given a normal childhood like all the other children? And at that moment I pray that my children will give me the benefit of the doubt. That they will say to themselves: Our daddy did the best he could, given the unique circumstances he faced. I hope that they will focus on the positive things, on the sacrifices I willingly made for them...". Journalist J. Randy Taraborrelli concluded that Jackson's performance during the speech was "absorbing" and well received.

Charities and causes supported
Following is a non-exhaustive list of charities supported by Michael Jackson. Because Jackson's charitable donations were not always publicized, the full extent of his activity in the field cannot be known.

Recognition for philanthropic work
On May 14, 1984, President Ronald Reagan gave Jackson a Presidential Humanitarian Award recognizing his support of alcohol and drug abuse charities, and of anti-drunk driving efforts. Prior to collecting the award, President Reagan sent Jackson a telegram, which read:

The presentation took place on May 14, 1984, at the White House. Upon reaching the podium, Reagan remarked,  "I hope you'll forgive me, but we have quite a few young folks in the White House who all wanted me to give you the same message. They said to tell Michael, "Please give some TLC to the PYTs." A reference to Jackson's Grammy Award-nominated song, "P.Y.T. (Pretty Young Thing)". Reagan also stated that Jackson "is proof of what a person can accomplish through a lifestyle free of alcohol or drug abuse. People young and old respect that. And if Americans follow his example, then we can face up to the problem of drinking and driving, and we can, in Michael's words, beat it". On May 1, 1992, President George H. W. Bush also presented Jackson with an award acknowledging him as "a point of light ambassador".

In 2000, Guinness World Records recognized him for supporting 39 charities, more than any other entertainer. Jackson was twice nominated for the Nobel Peace Prize for his humanitarian work, first in 1998, and again in 2003. After Jackson's death in 2009, many charitable donations were made in honor of his philanthropic work. Several speakers at the Michael Jackson memorial service referenced Jackson's philanthropic work, with Kobe Bryant of the Los Angeles Lakers calling Jackson "a true humanitarian, who gave as much off stage as he did onstage." Over 15,000 people petitioned for another Nobel Peace Prize nomination for Jackson, but the timing of his death made Jackson ineligible for consideration, although Jackson's song, "Man in the Mirror", was performed as the finale of the 2009 Nobel Peace Prize Concert.

Sheila Jackson Lee Resolution
Shortly after Jackson's death in 2009, Representative Sheila Jackson Lee authored a congressional resolution commemorating Jackson, specifically identifying 35 examples of philanthropic work on his part, partially reproduced below.

Awards and honors
Jackson has won numerous awards for his philanthropic and humanitarian endeavors, including honors from two Presidents of the United States. Following is a non-exhaustive list of the recognitions he has received:

See also
List of Michael Jackson records and achievements
List of awards and nominations received by Michael Jackson
Michael Forever – The Tribute Concert

References

Print sources

George, Nelson (2004). Michael Jackson: The Ultimate Collection booklet. Sony BMG.

Image Awards (NAACP) (1979)

External links
 Michael Jackson's Legacy: His Humanitarian Work
 Chronicle of Philanthropy article on Michael Jackson
 Guinness World Records entry for "Most charities supported by a pop star": Michael Jackson
 Joseph Vogel, Michael Jackson's Forgotten Humanitarian Legacy, HuffPost'' (September 24, 2017)
 Charity Navigator page on Michael Jackson and Philanthropy (July 7, 2009)

Michael Jackson
Jackson, Michael
Jackson, Michael